Ivan Stojanović (1829–1900) was a Catholic priest from Dubrovnik who wrote the book Dubrovačka Književnost, published in 1900, arguing that the people of Dubrovnik were Roman Catholic by religion, but by language Serbs. He was involved with the literary journal Slovinac.

Biography

Ivan "Ivo" Stojanović was born in Dubrovnik on 17 December 1829. He was taught in Dubrovnik and Zadar. At an early age he decided to take orders, becoming a priest upon his graduation from the Zadar Roman Catholic Seminary in 1852. He first spent a year in Korčula as a parish priest. After that he went to Rijeka where he spent the next thirty years. In his lifetime he befriended many politicians and men of letters, including Vlaho Getaldić, Luka Diego Sorkočević (grandson of the Dubrovnik composer) and Jozo Bunić. From 1883 until his death he was honoured and esteemed wherever he went. A warm admirer of Dositej Obradović, Stojanović was one of the leading members of a group of intellectuals, along with Niko Pucic, Medo Pucic, Pero Budmani, Luko Zore, Antun Paško Kazali, Pero Marinović, Konstantin Vojnović and his son Lujo Vojnović and many others who formed the Serb-Catholic Circle under the leadership of Baron Frano Getaldić-Gundulić of Dubrovnik. The chief dialogue of this movement, fostering inclusiveness for both Italians and Serbs, was Dom Ivo Stojanović.

Works

His reputation rests on his Dubrovačka Književnost (History of Literature in Dubrovnik), published in 1900 by Srpska Dubrovačka Akademiska Omladina, which has passed through many subsequent editions. He wrote many detached papers on various literary subjects, including the writings of St. Augustine, Aristophanes ("The Clouds"), Petronius, Gotthold Ephraim Lessing, Friedrich Schiller, Voltaire, Denis Diderot ("Rameau's Nephew"), Paul Louis Courier, Petar II Petrović Njegoš, and Edmondo De Amicis, his contemporary.

Stojanović translated a German historical book Geschichte des Freystaates Ragusa by Johann Christian Engel (1770–1814) into Serbian under the title of Najnovijie povjest Dubrovačke Republike (Current History of the Republic of Dubrovnik), published in Dubrovnik by Srpsko Dubrovačke Štamparije A. Pasarića, 1903. As a priest, historian and moralist, Stojanović divided his history of nineteenth-century Dubrovnik into three epochs: first, being the fall and death of Dubrovnik; second, the state of that moral body after death; and the rise of Dubrovnik from the ashes. Dubrovnik, of course, had beenin decline even before 1808, due, above all, to the lessening of its role as intermediary in Balkan and Levantine trade, and too to the falling of its merchant fleet in the Mediterranean.

Stojanović acted in the spirit of Vuk Karadžić, who is commonly called the father of modern Serbian culture.

References

 Ivan Stojanović, "Dubovačka Književnost" (Publisher: Srpska Dubrovačka Akademska Omladina, 1900). Translated Ivo Stojanović's brief biography from the Introduction.

1829 births
1900 deaths
People from Dubrovnik
People from the Kingdom of Dalmatia
Serb-Catholic movement in Dubrovnik
Serbian writers
Book and manuscript collectors
Serbian Roman Catholic priests
19th-century Austrian Roman Catholic priests
Serbs of Croatia